Carlarius is a genus of catfishes (order Siluriformes) of the family Ariidae.

Species
 Carlarius parkii (Günther, 1864) (Guinean sea catfish)
 Carlarius heudelotii (Valenciennes, 1840) (smoothmouth sea catfish)

References

Ariidae
Catfish genera